Latvia competed at the 2020 Summer Paralympics in Tokyo, Japan, from 24 August to 5 September 2021.

Medalists

Competitors

Archery 

Women

|-
|align=left|Ieva Melle
|align=left|Women's individual recurve open
|495
|21
|L 3-7
|colspan=5|did not advance
|}

Athletics 

Two Latvian athlete (Aigars Apinis & Diāna Dadzīte) successfully to break through the qualifications for the 2020 Paralympics after breaking the qualification limit.

Men's field

Women's field

Equestrian 

Latvian sent one athlete after qualified.

Individual

Swimming 

One Latvian swimmer has successfully entered the paralympic slot after breaking the MQS.

Men

See also
Latvia at the 2020 Summer Olympics

References 

Nations at the 2020 Summer Paralympics
2020
2021 in Latvian sport